Messaoud Bellemou is an Algerian musician and one of the most influential performers of modern raï music. He is considered by some people like one of the fathers of Modern Raï Music.

Messaoud began his career playing the trumpet but soon became known for adding foreign instruments like the saxophone, violin, and accordion to the genre. He worked during the 1970s with different raï singers of his generation like Boutaïaba Sghir, Boussouar El Maghnaoui, Bouteldja Belkacem.

References

Living people
Raï musicians
Algerian trumpeters
1947 births
21st-century trumpeters
21st-century male musicians
21st-century Algerian musicians
20th-century trumpeters
20th-century male musicians
20th-century Algerian musicians
People from Aïn Témouchent